Two buoy tenders of the United States Coast Guard have borne the name USCGC Fir.
 – built in 1938 and decommissioned in 1991.
 – launched in August 2003.

United States Coast Guard ship names